Calvin Tuteao is a New Zealand actor who has appeared in Hercules: The Legendary Journeys, Once Were Warriors and Xena: Warrior Princess. Tuteao is renowned for his role on Shortland Street as Dr. Victor Kahu. He and his niece Quantrelle King both acted in Shortland Street and also played an uncle and niece relationship. He plays the bass guitar.

Filmography

References

External links

Karen Kay Management
NZ On Screen
TVNZ Profile

New Zealand male film actors
New Zealand male television actors
New Zealand male soap opera actors
New Zealand male Māori actors
Year of birth missing (living people)
Living people
21st-century New Zealand male actors